Kenneth Turner (born 6 May 1944) is a former Australian politician. He was born in Brisbane. Before his involvement in politics he was a commercial fisherman, and served in the Citizens Military Force 1961–1965. In 1998 he was elected to the Legislative Assembly of Queensland as a member of Pauline Hanson's One Nation, representing the seat of Thuringowa. He was appointed Spokesperson for Communication, Local Government, Planning, Regional and Rural Communities, Environment, Heritage and Natural Resources, and Primary Industries on 7 August. On 6 February 1999, together with party colleagues Dorothy Pratt and Shaun Nelson, he resigned from One Nation to sit as an independent. He was defeated by Labor's Anita Phillips in 2001. He contested Thuringowa again at the 2009 state election against sitting Labor MP Craig Wallace, but received only around 11% of the vote.

References

1944 births
Living people
One Nation members of the Parliament of Queensland
People from Brisbane
Independent members of the Parliament of Queensland
Members of the Queensland Legislative Assembly
21st-century Australian politicians